is a former Japanese football player.

Club career
Takaya Kawanabe signed for Omiya Ardija in 2007. In 2011, he moved to Tanjong Pagar United FC and scored 9 goals in 36 appearances for the club. In February 2013 Kawanabe joined the Latvian Higher League club FC Jūrmala.

Later he played with FK Mladost Podgorica in the Montenegrin First League and next with FK Rudar Prijedor in the Premier League of Bosnia and Herzegovina.

Club statistics

References

External links

Omiya Ardija

1988 births
Living people
Association football people from Saitama Prefecture
Japanese footballers
Omiya Ardija players
Singapore Premier League players
Tanjong Pagar United FC players
FC Jūrmala players
OFK Titograd players
FK Rudar Prijedor players
J1 League players
Latvian Higher League players
Montenegrin First League players
Premier League of Bosnia and Herzegovina players
Japanese expatriate footballers
Expatriate footballers in Singapore
Japanese expatriate sportspeople in Latvia
Expatriate footballers in Latvia
Expatriate footballers in Montenegro
Expatriate footballers in Bosnia and Herzegovina
Association football midfielders